The Slag om Norg is a one-day cycling race held annually in the Netherlands. It is part of UCI Europe Tour in category 1.1 since 2017.

Winners

References

External links

Cycle races in the Netherlands
UCI Europe Tour races
Recurring sporting events established in 2012
2012 establishments in the Netherlands